The Río Grande (or Río Guapay) in Bolivia rises on the southern slope of the Cochabamba mountains, east of the city  Cochabamba, at . At its source it is known as the Rocha River. It crosses the Cochabamba valley basin in a westerly direction. After 65 km the river turns south east

From this junction the river receives the name Caine River for 162 km and continues to flow in a south easterly direction, before it is called Río Grande. After a total of 500 km the river turns north east and in a wide curve flows round the lowland city of Santa Cruz.

References

Rivers of Beni Department
Rivers of Santa Cruz Department (Bolivia)